The Antonov A-1 and related designs were a family of single-seat training gliders produced in the Soviet Union in the 1930s and 1940s.  All were derived from the Standard-2 (Стандарт-2) (designed and flown by Oleg Konstantinovich Antonov in 1930), which in turn was derived from the Standard-1. They were produced in large numbers, with around 5,400 built of the U-s3, U-s4 and P-s2 major versions alone. The same design formed the basis for the Antonov A-2 and its related group of two-seat designs. Altogether, including the two-seaters, production exceeded 7,600 by 1937.

While members of the family varied in detail, they shared the same basic design, and parts were interchangeable between them. The design featured a typical primary glider layout with a conventional empennage carried at the end of a long boom in place of a conventional fuselage. The boom could be folded sideways for storage. The monoplane wing was carried high on a pylon above this "keel" and was further braced to it with two struts on either side. The pilot sat in front of the wing, and was enclosed in a simple U-shaped wooden fairing that was removed by sliding it forward to allow him or her to enter and leave the aircraft. The undercarriage consisted of a single skid underneath the "keel", but this could also be fitted with small wooden wheels.

While the original primary training versions (designated У, 'U') featured wings of constant chord, subsequent variants designed for soaring flight (designated П, 'P') had longer-span wings with tapering outer panels and a streamlined nose fairing. The ultimate development in the line were gliders intended for towed flight (designated Б, 'B), which shared the longer wings and streamlined fairing of the P-types, but added a canopy to enclose the cockpit.

Unlicensed copies were produced in Turkey following World War II by THK and Makina ve Kimya Endüstrisi Kurumu (MKEK), as the THK-7 (P-s2) and THK-4 (U-s4).

Variants
In each case, the "s" stands for serii (серии: 'series')

Prototypes
Standard-1 (Стандарт-1)
Standard-2 (Стандарт-2)

Trainers
Uchebnyi (Учебный, 'Trainer')
U-s1 (У-с1)
U-s2 (У-с2) (First version built in series)
U-s3 (У-с3) (1,600 built)
U-s4 (У-с4) (Redesignated A-1, major production version. 3000 built)

Sailplanes
Paritel (Паритель, 'Sailplane'), also Upar (Упар, portmanteau of учебный паритель, uchebnyi paritel, 'training sailplane') (800 built)
P-s1 (П-с1)
P-s2 (П-с2)

Towed
Buksirovochnye (Буксировочные, 'Towed') (265 built by 1937)
B-s3 (Б-с3)
B-s4 (Б-с4)
B-s5 (Б-с5)

Specifications (A-1)

Notes

References

 
 
 
 
 

1930s Soviet sailplanes
Glider aircraft
A-01
Aircraft first flown in 1930